Maria Sharapova was the defending champion, but lost in the third round to Camila Giorgi.

Flavia Pennetta, at 32 years, became the tournament's oldest winner since Steffi Graf in 1996, defeating Agnieszka Radwańska in the final 6–2, 6–1.

Seeds
All seeds receive a bye into the second round.

 Li Na (semifinals)
 Agnieszka Radwańska (final)
 Victoria Azarenka (second round)
 Maria Sharapova (third round)
 Angelique Kerber (second round)
 Simona Halep (semifinals)
 Jelena Janković (quarterfinals)
 Petra Kvitová (fourth round)
 Sara Errani (third round)
 Caroline Wozniacki (fourth round)
 Ana Ivanovic (third round)
 Dominika Cibulková (quarterfinals)
 Roberta Vinci (third round)
 Carla Suárez Navarro (third round)
 Sabine Lisicki (second round)
 Samantha Stosur (third round)
 Sloane Stephens (quarterfinals)
 Eugenie Bouchard (fourth round)
 Kirsten Flipkens (second round)
 Flavia Pennetta (champion)
 Anastasia Pavlyuchenkova (third round)
 Alizé Cornet (fourth round)
 Ekaterina Makarova (third round)
 Kaia Kanepi (second round)
 Sorana Cîrstea (second round)
 Lucie Šafářová (third round)
 Svetlana Kuznetsova (third round)
 Klára Zakopalová (second round)
 Daniela Hantuchová (second round)
 Elena Vesnina (second round)
 Magdaléna Rybáriková (third round)
 Garbiñe Muguruza (second round)

Draw

Finals

Top half

Section 1

Section 2

Section 3

Section 4

Bottom half

Section 5

Section 6

Section 7

Section 8

Qualifying

Seeds

Qualifiers

Qualifying draw

First qualifier

Second qualifier

Third qualifier

Fourth qualifier

Fifth qualifier

Sixth qualifier

Seventh qualifier

Eighth qualifier

Ninth qualifier

Tenth qualifier

Eleventh qualifier

Twelfth qualifier

Notes

a.  María Teresa Torró Flor advanced to the second round after Galina Voskoboeva was forced to retire in the second set with an upper respiratory infection.
b.  Casey Dellacqua received a walkover into the quarterfinals after Lauren Davis withdrew from the tournament because of food poisoning.
c.  Sílvia Soler Espinosa advanced to the second round after Nadia Petrova was forced to retire in the first set with a lower right leg injury.

References
General

Specific

2014 WTA Tour
Women's Singles